Rosebud Creek is a creek in eastcentral Yukon, Canada.

The landscape surrounding Rosebud Creek lies in the Fort Selkirk Volcanic Field of the Northern Cordilleran Volcanic Province. During the Pliocene period, a basaltic lava flow from the Fort Selkirk field engulfed the Rosebud Creek area. Remnants of this lava flow are exposed along both sides of Rosebud Creek in the area of the confluence of Rosebud and Grand Valley creeks.

See also
List of rivers of Yukon
List of volcanoes in Canada
List of Northern Cordilleran volcanoes
Volcanism of Canada
Volcanism of Northern Canada

References

Rivers of Yukon
Volcanism of Yukon
Pliocene volcanism